Fairchild is a village in Eau Claire County, Wisconsin, United States. The population was 550 at the 2010 census. The village is located within the Town of Fairchild.

History
The Fairchild post office has been operating since 1870. The village was named for Lucius Fairchild, the 10th Governor of Wisconsin.

Geography
Fairchild is located at  (44.599554, -90.959543).

The village falls on the intersections of US Highway 12 and US Highway 10.  It is ten miles east of Interstate 94.

Climate
The Köppen Climate Classification subtype for this climate is "Dfb" (Warm Summer Continental Climate).

Demographics

2010 census
As of the census of 2010, there were 550 people, 227 households, and 148 families residing in the village. The racial makeup of the village was 94.2% White, 1.6% Native American, 0.2% Asian, 2.0% from other races, and 2.0% from two or more races. Hispanic or Latino of any race were 2.2% of the population.

There were 227 households, of which 30.8% had children under the age of 18 living with them, 41.9% were married couples living together, 14.1% had a female householder with no husband present, 9.3% had a male householder with no wife present, and 34.8% were non-families. 28.6% of all households were made up of individuals, and 12.8% had someone living alone who was 65 years of age or older. The average household size was 2.42 and the average family size was 2.93.

The median age in the village was 40 years. 24% of residents were under the age of 18; 9.5% were between the ages of 18 and 24; 25.4% were from 25 to 44; 22.7% were from 45 to 64; and 18.4% were 65 years of age or older. The gender makeup of the village was 48.5% male and 51.5% female.

2000 census
As of the census of 2000, there were 564 people, 210 households, and 136 families residing in the village. The population density was 387.4 people per square mile (149.2/km2). There were 236 housing units at an average density of 162.1 per square mile (62.4/km2). The racial makeup of the village was 98.40% White, 1.24% Native American, and 0.35% from two or more races. 1.77% of the population were Hispanic or Latino of any race.

There were 210 households, out of which 30.0% had children under the age of 18 living with them, 48.6% were married couples living together, 11.0% had a female householder with no husband present, and 35.2% were non-families. 29.5% of all households were made up of individuals, and 15.2% had someone living alone who was 65 years of age or older. The average household size was 2.50 and the average family size was 3.13.

In the village, the population was spread out, with 27.8% under the age of 18, 7.1% from 18 to 24, 26.8% from 25 to 44, 17.2% from 45 to 64, and 21.1% who were 65 years of age or older. The median age was 37 years. For every 100 females, there were 100.0 males. For every 100 females age 18 and over, there were 104.5 males.

The median income for a household in the village was $23,625, and the median income for a family was $27,500. Males had a median income of $23,750 versus $17,083 for females. The per capita income for the village was $12,729. About 12.7% of families and 18.0% of the population were below the poverty line, including 23.9% of those under age 18 and 32.5% of those age 65 or over.

Media
WEAU
WAXX

Notable people
 Taylor Frye, Wisconsin State Representative
 George S. Graves, Wisconsin State Representative
 Carole Landis, actress
 Louis V. Mato, Wisconsin State Representative

References

External links
 Sanborn fire insurance map: 1894

Villages in Eau Claire County, Wisconsin
Villages in Wisconsin